Pavel Chelyadko ((born 3 March 1993) is a Belarusian professional footballer who plays as a full-back for Orlęta Radzyń Podlaski.

Honours
Torpedo-BelAZ Zhodino
Belarusian Cup winner: 2015–16

References

External links
 
 

1993 births
Living people
Belarusian footballers
Association football defenders
Belarusian expatriate footballers
Belarus under-21 international footballers
FC Slonim-2017 players
FC Slavia Mozyr players
FC Dnepr Mogilev players
FC Dynamo Brest players
FC Torpedo-BelAZ Zhodino players
FC Rukh Brest players
Belarusian Premier League players
Belarusian First League players
III liga players
Belarusian expatriate sportspeople in Poland
Expatriate footballers in Poland
People from Baranavichy
Sportspeople from Brest Region